Courage is an EP released in 1993 by New Zealand band The Bats.

Track listing

Personnel
Malcolm Grant - drums
Paul Kean - bass, vocals
Robert Scott - guitar, lead vocals
Kaye Woodward - guitar, vocals

References

1993 EPs
The Bats (New Zealand band) albums
Flying Nun Records EPs
Dunedin Sound albums